Nero is a chocolate- and liquorice-based candy bar made by Nidar AS of Trondheim, Norway. It consists of a liquorice-flavoured jelly with additional aniseed and fennel oil flavourings, covered in a layer of 45%-cacao dark chocolate.

External links
 Nidar official website in Norwegian

Liquorice (confectionery)
Norwegian confectionery
Chocolate bars
Brand name chocolate
Anise